This is a listing of notable people born in, or notable for their association with, Aceh.



A
 Mustafa Abubakar, politician and formerly governor of the province of Aceh (Pidie Jaya Regency)

B
 Daud Bereueh, military Governor of Aceh and leader of the Darul Islam rebellion in the province (Pidie Regency)

C
 Bachtiar Chamsyah, politician in United Development Party (PPP) and Indonesian government minister under Yudhoyono presidency (Sigli)

D
 Cut Nyak Dhien, National Hero of Indonesia (Aceh Besar Regency)
 Jusman Syafii Djamal, Minister of Transportation (Langsa)
 Hilbram Dunar, television presenter, radio broadcaster, master of ceremonies, and entertainer (Banda Aceh)

H
 Teuku Muhammad Hasan, National Hero of Indonesia, politician, The first Governor of Sumatera (Pidie Regency)
 Miftahul Hamdi, footballer (Banda Aceh)

J
 Teuku Jacob, paleoanthropologist (Peureulak)
 Jalwandi, footballer (Langsa)

M
 Azriana Manalu, women's rights activist
 Cut Nyak Meutia, National Hero of Indonesia (North Aceh Regency)

N
 Muhammad Nazar, current Vice-Governor of Aceh (Pidie Regency)

P
 Surya Paloh, media tycoon who owns the Media Indonesia daily newspaper and Metro TV (Banda Aceh)

R
 P. Ramlee, famous Malaysian actor, movie director, musician and singer.

S
 Hasballah M. Saad, politician from National Mandate Party (Pidie Regency)

T
 Henri Karel Frederik van Teijn, a governor under Dutch colonial rule
 Hasan di Tiro, founder of the Free Aceh Movement (GAM) (Pidie Regency)

U
 Teuku Umar, National Hero of Indonesia (West Aceh Regency)

W
 Cornelis Weber, Dutch Olympic fencer (Banda Aceh)

Y
 Irwandi Yusuf, current Governor of Aceh (Bireun)

Aceh
Aceh